HSwMS Remus (28) was a  of the Royal Swedish Navy during World War II. She was stricken in 1958 and scrapped in 1961.

Notes

References 
 
 Robert Gardner, Conway's All the World's Fighting Ships 1922–1946 (1980) Conway Publishing : 
Remus at Miramar ship index (subscription view)

External links
 Astore Marina Militare website

Ships built in Naples
1934 ships
Romulus-class destroyers